Perro amor is a Colombian telenovela produced by Cenpro Televisión for Canal Uno, and it started airing on Colombian broadcast channel Canal Uno in February 1998, and concluded in June 1999. It stars Danna García, and Julián Arango.

After the success of the telenovela in its original broadcast, it was retransmitted on 19 October 2000 on Canal Uno, and since then it has not been retransmitted. In 2010 an adaptation with the same name was made for the United States, which premiered on Telemundo and starred Carlos Ponce.

Plot 
The story revolves around Antonio Brando (Julián Arango) and Sofía Santana (Danna García), both strangers who know each other after Antonio decided to place a bet with his cousin.

Cast 
 Danna García as Sofía Santana
 Julián Arango as Antonio Brando "El Perro"
 Isabella Santodomingo as Camila Brando
 Óscar Borda as Ricardo Pérez "Rocky París"
 Ana María Orozco as Verónica Murillo
 Fernando Solórzano as Bernardo Caparroso "Benny"
 Frank Ramírez as Pedro Brando
 Diego Trujillo as Gonzalo Cáceres
 Patricia Maldonado as Rosario Sierra de Santana
 Consuelo Luzardo as Carmen de Brando
 Carmenza Gómez as Cristina de Brando
 Jorge Enrique Abello as Diego Tamayo
 Christian del Real as Christian
 Fanny Lu as Ana María Brando
 Estefanía Gómez as Peggy Camacho
 Cheo Feliciano as Himserlf
 Joe Arroyo as Himserlf

References

External links 
 

1998 telenovelas
Colombian telenovelas
1998 Colombian television series debuts
1999 Colombian television series endings
Spanish-language telenovelas